The Canon EF 400mm are seven super-telephoto lenses made by Canon. These lenses have an EF mount that work with the EOS line of cameras. These lenses are widely used by sports and wildlife photographers.

Canon has manufactured four 400mm prime lenses:
EF 400mm 2.8L IS III USM
EF 400mm 2.8L IS II USM
EF 400mm 4 DO IS II USM
EF 400mm 5.6L USM

The 400mm 4 DO IS II USM, which replaced an earlier version of the same lens in 2014, is one of only two Canon lenses that make use of diffractive optics (the other is the EF 70–300mm f/4.5–5.6 DO IS USM). The use of diffractive optics allows the lens to be significantly lighter than it might otherwise be.

These lenses are compatible with the Canon Extender EF teleconverters.

Specifications of the EF 400mm lenses

Use in astronomy

Canon 400 mm f/2.8 L IS II USM lenses are used in the Dragonfly Telephoto Array. The array is designed to image astronomical objects with low surface brightness such as some satellite galaxies. The array started with three lenses but this has since increased to 24 with plans for 50.

References

Canon EF lenses
Canon L-Series lenses